Keith Thibodeaux (born December 1, 1950), also known as Richard Keith, is an American actor and musician, best known for playing Little Ricky on the television sitcoms I Love Lucy and The Lucy–Desi Comedy Hour. He was billed as Richard Keith because his Cajun French last name, "Thibodeaux", was considered too difficult to pronounce by producer Desi Arnaz. He is the last living regular appearing cast member from I Love Lucy.

Career

Thibodeaux showed skill on the drums at a young age, and was making $500 ($ in  dollars ) a week at the age of 3 while touring with the Horace Heidt Orchestra. His father took him to audition for the part of Little Ricky in 1955, "I walked on the set and there was Lucy, she was standing there and she was looking at me," he said. "She said 'OK he's cute, but what does he do?' My dad said, 'Well he plays the drums' and she said, 'Oh, come on--I can't believe that.' Then, she says 'Look, we have a drum set over there, go ahead and let him play.' Eventually Desi Arnaz himself came over and started jamming with me on the drums and then he kind of stood up and said 'Well, I think we found Little Ricky.'"

According to Lucie Arnaz, who was interviewed on the TV show Archive of American Television, he became like part of the family. "For a long time I thought Keith was related to us, because he went everywhere with us. Desi (Jr.) considered him his best friend and [he] was responsible for teaching him the drums. He came over to our house on many weekends and traveled with them during the summer. My mother kind of adopted him. He is in all of our home movies and photographs growing up and was a great kid, and still is."

As a child, he made 13 appearances on The Andy Griffith Show, between 1962 and 1966, usually as Opie's friend "Johnny Paul Jason". He later described The Andy Griffith Show set as a far more laid-back and pleasant experience compared to I Love Lucy, though due to age differences between himself and Ron Howard, he never grew as close to that show's cast as he did to the Arnaz family. He also accepted small roles on other popular television shows.

In 1964 Thibodeaux appeared for a split second in an episode of The Lucy Show titled "Lucy is a Process Server." Initially he was featured in a comedic sequence at a train station in which a vending machine malfunctions. However, the scene was cut when the show ran too long. After the episode was edited, Thibodeaux is only seen for a moment, entering the station. Nevertheless, Thibodeaux remained in the credits listed as Richard Keith, the actor who played "Little Boy."

In 1969, Thibodeaux joined the rock group David and the Giants who were based in Laurel, Mississippi. The group recorded in its early years with Capitol Records, Fame Records, and Crazy Horse Records, primarily touring throughout the South, and enjoyed a few regional hits which were recorded in Muscle Shoals, Alabama, and were well known in the Northern Soul music scene in England. After turning 21 in 1971, Thibodeaux received a final payment of $8,000 from a trust fund set up during his days on I Love Lucy

Thibodeaux had developed a drug problem and eventually left the band, which broke up. His difficulties led to his becoming a born-again Christian in 1974. He witnessed to the band leader, David Huff, and the other members, who later converted. The group got back together. The band released nearly ten albums in the 1980s and 1990s for CBS Priority Records (Epic Records), The Benson Company, ABC Word Records (Myrrh) label, and the band's own label Giant Records. David and the Giants released a live CD in 2014 titled Still Rockin. In 2017, the band was honored along with other notable Mississippi musicians such as Steve Forbert, Tammy Wynette, George Soule, and Elvis Presley, by receiving "The Jimmie" Mississippi Dreamers (Jimmie Rodgers Award) for their musical contributions as Mississippi artists at a special concert at Peavey Electronics Corporate headquarters in Meridian, MS, along with Hartley Peavey.

A live concert David and the Giants CD/DVD The Best Is Yet To Come was recorded in St. Louis, MO. in August 2017 celebrating 40 years of David and the Giants music.

In 1990, he became the Executive Director for his wife's company, Ballet Magnificat! which tours nationally and internationally. In 2017 the couple pioneered Ballet Magnificat! Brasil dance company and trainee program headquartered in Curitiba, Brazil.

Personal life
Raised as a Roman Catholic, Thibodeaux went to school at St. Victor's elementary in West Hollywood and St. Jane Frances de Chantal School in North Hollywood. He attended Notre Dame High School in Sherman Oaks for two years before his parents separated in 1966.

After his parents separated, Keith, his mother, and siblings moved back to Lafayette, Louisiana.  He graduated from Lafayette High School where he continued to play drums in rock and rhythm and blues bands. He left Louisiana for Mississippi in late 1969 after going to college for a short period where he said he "majored in drinking beer and playing pool" to pursue a career with the band David and the Giants.

In 1976, he met and married ballet dancer Kathy Denton in Jackson, Mississippi. The couple moved briefly to Southern California in 1977 where he was asked to join the pop band Starbuck famous for the late '70s hit "Moonlight Feels Right". Thibodeaux returned to Mississippi in 1978, where he, his wife and daughter Tara (born 1979) eventually settled in Jackson, Mississippi. Thibodeaux played with jazz bands locally for a brief time before joining a newly revamped Christian rock band, David and the Giants in 1979.

Thibodeaux's autobiography Life After Lucy was published in 1994.

References

External links
 
 Ballet Magnificat! website
 David and the Giants website
 

1950 births
20th-century American male actors
20th-century American male musicians
20th-century Christians
21st-century American male musicians
21st-century Christians
American evangelicals
American male child actors
American male film actors
American male television actors
American performers of Christian music
Cajun musicians
Former Roman Catholics
Living people
Male actors from Los Angeles
Musicians from Lafayette, Louisiana
Musicians from Los Angeles
Musicians from Mississippi
Notre Dame High School (Sherman Oaks, California) alumni
People from Lafayette, Louisiana